Diego Capria (born 27 August 1972 in Argentina) is an Argentinean retired footballer.

References

Argentine footballers
Living people
Association football defenders
1972 births
Estudiantes de La Plata footballers
Instituto footballers
Querétaro F.C. footballers
Club Atlético Huracán footballers
Racing Club de Avellaneda footballers
Chacarita Juniors footballers
FC Zürich players
Quilmes Atlético Club footballers